Procapperia ankaraica is a moth of the family Pterophoridae that is endemic to Turkey.

The forewings are brown. Adults are on wing in May.

References

Moths described in 2003
Oxyptilini
Endemic fauna of Turkey
Moths of Asia